Jeremiah Troy (1845–1917) was a United States Navy sailor and a recipient of the United States military's highest decoration, the Medal of Honor.

Biography
Born in 1845 in New York, New York, Troy joined the Navy from that state. By April 21, 1882, he was serving as a chief boatswain's mate on the training ship . On that day, while New Hampshire was at Newport, Rhode Island, he and another sailor, Boatswain's Mate James F. Sullivan, jumped overboard and rescued Third Class Boy Francis T. Price from drowning. For this action, both Troy and Sullivan were awarded the Medal of Honor two and a half years later, on October 18, 1884.

Troy's official Medal of Honor citation reads:
For jumping overboard from the U.S. Training Ship New Hampshire, at Newport, R.I., 21 April 1882, and rescuing from drowning Francis T. Price, third class boy.

Troy died on January 11, 1897, in Brooklyn, New York and is buried in the Holy Cross Cemetery in Brooklyn.

See also

List of Medal of Honor recipients in non-combat incidents

References

External links

1845 births
1917 deaths
Military personnel from New York City
United States Navy sailors
United States Navy Medal of Honor recipients
Non-combat recipients of the Medal of Honor